Mariela Spacek (born 3 November 1974) is an Austrian judoka. She competed in the women's middleweight event at the 1996 Summer Olympics.

References

1974 births
Living people
Austrian female judoka
Olympic judoka of Austria
Judoka at the 1996 Summer Olympics
Sportspeople from Dubrovnik
20th-century Austrian women